Group D of the 2013 Fed Cup Europe/Africa Zone Group III was one of four pools in the Europe/Africa Zone Group III of the 2013 Fed Cup. Three teams competed in a round robin competition, with the top team and the bottom two teams proceeding to their respective sections of the play-offs: the top team played for advancement to Group II.

Standings

Round-robin

Norway vs. Cyprus

Liechtenstein vs. Madagascar

Norway vs. Liechtenstein

Cyprus vs. Madagascar

Norway vs. Madagascar

Liechtenstein vs. Cyprus

See also
Fed Cup structure

References

External links
 Fed Cup website

2013 Fed Cup Europe/Africa Zone